1N or 1-N may refer to:

1st parallel north
Canon EOS-1N
Bell UH-1N Twin Huey, part of the U.S. Marine H-1 upgrade program
Canon F-1n, a model of Canon F-1
Olympus OM-1n, a model of Olympus OM-1
SH 1N, the North Island section of New Zealand State Highway 1
1N, a model of Toyota N engine
UH-1N Huey, see Bell UH-1 Iroquois
Secondary State Highway 1N (Washington 1937-1943), a loop west of Centralia
Secondary State Highway 1N (Washington 1943–1970), now Washington State Route 507 from Centralia to Tenino
CUH-1N, Canadian version of what became the Bell 212
Sikorsky HSS-1N Seabat, see Sikorsky H-34
F7F-1N, see Grumman F7F Tigercat
F8F-1N Bearcat, see Grumman F8F Bearcat
XF8F-1N, see Grumman F8F Bearcat
J/1N Alpha, see Auster Autocrat
One newton, see Newton (unit)

See also
N1 (disambiguation)